The second season of Salem, an American horror–drama television series on WGN America, premiered on April 5, 2015, and concluded on June 28, 2015, consisting of thirteen episodes. Created for television by Adam Simon and Brannon Braga, who write or co-write episodes of the show, the series is based on the Salem Witch Trials. It was executive produced by Braga, Coby Greenberg and David Von Ancken, with Braga and Simon assuming the role of showrunner.

The second season was announced on May 15, 2014 after only four episodes of the first season had aired.

Cast

Main cast 
Janet Montgomery as Mary Sibley, Salem's most powerful enchantress (13 episodes)
Shane West as Captain John Alden, Mary's love interest (13 episodes)
Seth Gabel as Cotton Mather, the local witch hunter (13 episodes)
Ashley Madekwe as Tituba, Mary's slave and fellow witch (11 episodes)
Tamzin Merchant as Anne Hale, the daughter of the Magistrate (11 episodes)
Elise Eberle as Mercy Lewis, a tortured victim from the witches (11 episodes)
Iddo Goldberg as Isaac Walton, branded the fornicator (9 episodes)
Joe Doyle as Baron Sebastian von Marburg, Countess von Marburg's son (10 episodes)
Oliver Bell as Little John, Mary and John Alden's son (13 episodes)

Recurring cast
Lucy Lawless as Countess Palatine Ingrid von Marburg, an original witch hoping to raise the devil (11 episodes)
Stuart Townsend as Dr. Samuel Wainwright, a new doctor hoping to cure Salem of the plague (10 episodes)
Jeremy Crutchley as Wendell Hathorne, the new elected Magistrate (9 episodes)
Sammi Hanratty as Dollie Trask, Mercy's best friend (7 episodes)
Cara Santana as Sooleawa, an Indian girl (5 episodes)
Michael Mulheren as George Sibley, the elected official of Salem

Guest cast
Stephen Lang as Increase Mather, Cotton's father who takes over the witch hunt (2 episodes)
Christopher Berry as The Seer, a man who lives in the woods (2 episodes)

Production

Writing 
The writing team for the show had a major overhaul after the first season. Among the first season staff, only Adam Simon, Brannon Braga and Joe Menosky remained on the show. In an interview with Gavin Hetherington of SpoilerTV, Simon said "there were some very talented writers that worked on season one but they also came from very different backgrounds. They had very strong opinions where they wanted things to go, which was great, except they were telling 13 different stories and I was trying to tell one story in 13 episodes." There were inconsistencies with the writing between episodes due to the sometimes clashing writing style, and Simon further commented that "sometimes it seemed to me that characters I created suddenly sounded very different [in the episodes Adam didn't write], they weren't even speaking quite the same language from episode to episode which was tough on the actors and on the audience."

As a result of this, Elizabeth Sarnoff, Tricia Small and Jon Harmon Feldman did not return for season two. A new writing staff were brought in, and the three remaining writers from season one were joined by Kelly Souders, Brian Peterson, Turi Meyer, Al Septien—who all had previously worked on Smallville together—and Donna Thorland.

Episodes

Reception

Critical response 
Upon reviewing several episodes of the second season, Gavin Hetherington of SpoilerTV called Salem the "best goddamn show on TV right now."

Accolades

Ratings

Notes

References

External links 

 
 

2015 American television seasons